The Irkutsk electoral district was a constituency created for the 1917 Russian Constituent Assembly election. The electoral district covered the Irkutsk Governorate. The constituency was assigned 5 seats in the Constituent Assembly.

Results
In Irkutsk town the SR list got 8,664 votes (33.9%), the Bolsheviks 7,815 votes (31.6%), Kadets 5,537 votes (21.7%), Mensheviks 1,610 votes (6.3%), Autonomists and Popular Socialist list 1,068 votes (4.2%), Orthodox list 807 votes (3.2%) and the Buryat list 28 votes (0.1%). The Irkutsk garrison constituted a major share of the urban electorate, in the garrison the SRs got 6,064 votes (31.5%), the Bolsheviks 5,906 votes (30.7%), the Kadets 4,740 votes (24.6%), Mensheviks 1,097 votes (5.7%), the Autonomists/Popular Socialists 901 votes (4.7%), the Orthodox list 520 votes (2.7%) and the Buryat list 23 votes (0.1%).

References

Electoral districts of the Russian Constituent Assembly election, 1917